The 1914 NCAA baseball season, play of college baseball in the United States organized by the National Collegiate Athletic Association (NCAA) began in the spring of 1914.  Play largely consisted of regional matchups, some organized by conferences, and ended in June.  No national championship event was held until 1947.

Conference winners
This is a partial list of conference champions from the 1914 season.

Award winners

All-Southern team

References